The COVID-19 pandemic is an ongoing coronavirus outbreak that began in 2019.

2019–2020 outbreak may also refer to:
2019–20 locust infestation
2019–2020 measles outbreak in the Democratic Republic of the Congo
2019–2020 New Zealand measles outbreak
2019–20 Philippines polio outbreak
2019–2020 vaping lung illness outbreak